There are four abolished electorates by the name of Wellington in Australia:

 Electoral district of Wellington (New South Wales)
 Electoral district of Wellington (Tasmania)
 Electoral district of Wellington (Western Australia)
 Electoral district of Wellington (Legislative Council)

Additionally, three other past and present electorates incorporate the name Wellington:

 Electoral district of Murray-Wellington (Western Australia, current)
 Electoral district of Wellington (County) (New South Wales, abolished)
 Electoral district of Wellington and Bligh (New South Wales, abolished)